Kenya competed at the 2020 Summer Paralympics in Tokyo, Japan, from 24 August to 5 September 2021.

Medalists

Competitors

Athletics 

Two Kenyan athlete Samwel Kimani (Men's 1500m & 5000m T11) & Nancy Chelangat Koech (Women's 1500m T11) successfully to break through the qualifications for the 2020 Paralympics after breaking the qualification limit.

Powerlifting

Rowing

Kenya qualified one boats in the women's single sculls events for the games by winning the gold medal at the 2019 FISA African Qualification Regatta in Tunis, Tunisia.

Qualification Legend: FA=Final A (medal); FB=Final B (non-medal); R=Repechage

See also 
Kenya at the Paralympics
Kenya at the 2020 Summer Olympics

References 

2020
Nations at the 2020 Summer Paralympics
2021 in Kenyan sport